María Villalón Sánchez (born 1 April 1989 in Ronda, Málaga, Spain), is a Spanish singer and most notably the winner of the first series of the Spanish version of The X Factor in 2007.

Biography
Villalón grew up singing from an early age. She attended a music conservatory, learning to play cello when she was 10. She published two studio albums with a small Andalusian record label. In 2006, Villalón took part in the television show Bienvenidos on Canal Sur, and she auditioned for the reality television music competition Operación Triunfo, reaching the top 90 of candidates, but she was not selected.

Factor X
Villalón rose to fame in 2007 at the age of seventeen when she auditioned for the reality show music competition Factor X, the Spanish version of The X Factor, aired on Cuatro. She went on to win the series performing Dulce Pontes' "Cançao do mar" and Pasión Vega's "María se bebe las calles".

After Factor X
After her win, Villalón released the studio album Te espero aquí with Sony BMG. The album was released on 13 November 2007. Its first and only single was "Agüita de abril".

Her second album, Los tejados donde fuimos más que amigos, gave her another Top 40 single titled La lluvia

After some time living in Scotland and retiring from music, Villalón came back to prominence in 2018 as one of the participants of the seventh season of the reality series Tu cara me suena, where celebrity contestants impersonate singers. On 8 February 2019, she was declared the winner of the season.

Discography

Albums
2000: Entre sueños
2002: Rompe 
2007: Las mejores canciones de María en Factor X 
2008: Te espero aquí 
2009: Los tejados donde fuimos más que amigos
2012: Historias de una cantonta
2015: El insólito viaje de una gota de lluvia

EP's
2022: Tratado de Paz

Singles
2007: "Agüita de abril" 
2008: "Amores que matan"
2009: "La lluvia"
2010: "Cosas que no sé de ti"
2010: "Quiero que estés aquí"
2012: "La ciudad de las bicicletas"
2013: "Todo arde"
2014: "Dieta para dos"
2014: "Descalza"
2015: "Ni tú ni yo"
2016: "Mágico y absurdo"
2018: "La batalla"
2021: "Pañuelos de seda"
2022: "Despierta, corazón"
2022: "Tratado de paz"

References

External links
 Official site
 Official fan site
 Official MySpace site
 Official YouTube channel
 Official blog

The X Factor winners
1989 births
Living people
People from Ronda
Singers from Andalusia
21st-century Spanish singers
21st-century Spanish women singers
Esperanto-language singers